The Ministry of Sports of the Russian Federation  (Russian: Министерство спорта Российской Федерации), often abbreviated as Minsport (Минспорт), is a ministry of the Government of Russia responsible for sports.

The Ministry of Sports oversees the implementation of government policy and regulation of sport, providing state services and federal funding for athletes, and also managing public property in the area of sport and physical fitness in Russia. The ministry was created by the Medvedev Government in 2008 as the Ministry of Sports, Tourism and Youth Policy and has existed in its current form since May 21, 2012. It is headquartered at Kazakov Street 18 in Basmanny District, Moscow.

Oleg Matytsin has served as the Minister of Sports since 21 January 2020.

Structure
The Ministry is composed of two branches:
 Department  of Sports Development
 Department of State Policy in Sport

History

Soviet period
The State Committee for Sports and Physical Education of the USSR (Спорткомитет СССР, Комитет по физической культуре и спорту при Совете Министров СССР) was established in 1954 as the only governmental body responsible for the management of sports in the Soviet Union. The committee was a result of the merging of all the sports unions and national teams into one organization.

Post-Soviet
The State Committee for Sports and Physical Education of Russia (Госкомитет по ФКиТ; Госкомспорт России, Государственный комитет Российской Федерации по физической культуре и спорту) was created in 1991. It was the central governing body for Russian sports. The head of the committee was referred to as the Sports Minister. The committee was a federal executive organization that was responsible for the coordination and development of sports in Russia.

Since 2002
The Federal Agency for Sports and Body Culture (Федеральное агентство по физической культуре и спорту) was created in 2002 as the successor to the previous sports committee. It was dissolved on October 7, 2008, to be re-established with its current name.

Involvement in Russian doping scandal

An independent investigation led by law professor Richard McLaren found corroborating evidence that Russian Ministry of Sport and the FSB had operated a "state-directed failsafe system" using a "disappearing positive [test] methodology" (DPM) from "at least late 2011 to August 2015".

Officials

Ministers of Sport
Boris Ivanyuzhenkov (2008)
Vitaly Mutko (2008–2016)
Pavel Kolobkov (2016–2020)
Oleg Matytsin (Since 2020)

Heads of Sports Committee 
 Shamil Tarpishchev (1994–1996)
 Leonid Tyagachev (1996–1999)
 Pavel Rozhkov (1999–2001)

Head of Hockey Department
 Yuri Korolev (1974–1983)

Heads of Federal Sports Agency
 Vyacheslav Fetisov (2002–2008)

See also
Sport in Russia
Russian Olympic Committee
Russian Paralympic Committee
Doping in Russia

References

External links
Official Website

Federal ministries of Russia
Sports governing bodies in Russia
Doping in Russia